Edam-Volendam is a municipality in the northwest Netherlands, in the province of North Holland, primarily consisting of the towns of Edam and Volendam. It is situated on the western shore of the Markermeer, just north of Waterland. In 2019, it had a population of 36,099.

Since 2016, the former municipality of Zeevang has merged with the municipality of Edam-Volendam.

Local government
The municipal council of Edam-Volendam consists of 25 seats, divided as follows (2016):

 Lijst Kras: 6 seats
 Volendam '80: 4 seats 
 CDA: 4 seats
 Zeevangs Belang: 4 seats
 VVD: 3 seats
 GroenLinks: 3 seats
 PvdA: 1 seat

Topography

Notable people 

 Geertje Dircx (ca.1610-1615 in Edam – ca.1656) the lover of Rembrandt van Rijn 
 Ed van der Elsken (1925–1990), Dutch photographer and filmmaker
 Boudewijn Hendricksz (died 1626) a Dutch corsair and later Admiral; also burgemeester of Edam
 Trijntje Keever (1616–1633) the tallest female person in recorded history, standing 2.54 metres (8 ft 4 in) tall when she died
 Kristofer Schipper (born 1934 in Järnskog) a Dutch sinologist and academic
 Abraham Staphorst (ca.1638 in Edam – 1696) a Dutch Golden Age painter 
 Jan Janz Slop (1643 in Edam – 1727) a Dutch Golden Age painterp
 Maria Leer (1788 in Edam – 1866) a prophetess and Dutch religious figure
 Piet Veerman (born 1943 in Volendam) a Dutch pop musician
 Jan Keizer (born 1949 in Volendam) a Dutch singer and composer, with the popband BZN
 Bernadette (born Bernadette Kraakman, 1959 in Volendam) a Dutch singer, took part in the 1983 Eurovision Song Contest
 Maribelle (born Marie Kwakman, 1960 in Volendam) a Dutch singer, took part in the 1984 Eurovision Song Contest
 Mona Keijzer (born 1968 in Edam) a Dutch politician
 Jan Smit (born 1985 in Volendam) a Dutch singer, TV host, actor and football director
 Geraldine Kemper (born 1990 in Volendam) Dutch TV presenter
 Abraham Isaacsen Verplanck (1606–1690) early settler in New Netherlands,emigrated ca. 1633

Sport 
 Coen de Koning (1879–1954) speed skater and cyclist
 Gerrie Mühren (1946 in Volendam – 2013) Dutch footballer with over 350 club caps
 Arnold Mühren (born 1951 in Volendam) Dutch football manager and former midfielder with 516 club caps 

 Pier Tol (born 1958 in Volendam) a Dutch retired international footballer with 344 club caps
 Jack Tuijp (born 1983 in Volendam) retired Dutch football striker with about 400 club caps
 Wim Jonk (born 1966 in Volendam) Dutch football coach and former player with 368 club caps 
 Gerry Koning (born 1980 in Volendam) Dutch former footballer with over 350 club caps
 Henny Schilder (born 1984 in Volendam) Dutch football player, 375 club caps with FC Volendam

Gallery

References

External links
 
 Official website

 
Municipalities of North Holland